Potassium voltage-gated channel subfamily KQT member 4, also known as voltage-gated potassium channel subunit Kv7.4, is a protein that in humans is encoded by the KCNQ4 gene.

Function

The protein encoded by this gene forms a potassium channel that is thought to play a critical role in the regulation of neuronal excitability, particularly in sensory cells of the cochlea. The encoded protein can form a homomultimeric potassium channel or possibly a heteromultimeric channel in association with the protein encoded by the KCNQ3 gene.

Clinical significance 

The current generated by this channel is inhibited by muscarinic acetylcholine receptor M1 and activated by retigabine, a novel anti-convulsant drug. Defects in this gene are a cause of nonsyndromic sensorineural deafness type 2 (DFNA2), an autosomal dominant form of progressive hearing loss. Two transcript variants encoding different isoforms have been found for this gene.

Ligands 

 ML213: KCNQ2/Q4 channel opener.

See also
 Voltage-gated potassium channel

References

Further reading

External links
  GeneReviews/NCBI/NIH/UW entry on Deafness and Hereditary Hearing Loss Overview
 
 GeneReviews/NCBI/NIH/UW entry on DFNA2 Nonsyndromic Hearing Loss

Ion channels